Thomas Daniel Robinson (born 1950 or 1951), known as Tom Robinson, is a former unionist politician in Northern Ireland.

Robinson worked as an Independent Financial Advisor.  He joined the Ulster Unionist Party (UUP), and was elected to Larne Borough Council at the 1977 Northern Ireland local elections.  He held his seat in 1981, and was elected Deputy Mayor of Larne in 1982, then Mayor in 1983.

Robinson was elected for the Coast Road district at the local 1985, 1989, 1993 and 1997 local elections.  He was also elected to the Northern Ireland Forum in 1996, representing East Antrim.

By 2000, Robinson had become a prominent critic of UUP leader David Trimble.  He lost his council seat in 2001, and subsequently defected to the UK Unionist Party (UKUP).  He stood for this new party at the 2003 Northern Ireland Assembly election, but took only 1.8% of the vote and was not elected.

Robinson stood again for Larne Borough Council at the 2005 local elections, this time as an independent candidate, but took only 57 votes and was again unsuccessful.  He also failed to win a seat at the 2007 Northern Ireland Assembly election, standing again for the UKUP, and subsequently joined the Traditional Unionist Voice party.

References

1950 births
People from Larne
Mayors of places in Northern Ireland
Members of the Northern Ireland Forum
Traditional Unionist Voice politicians
UK Unionist Party politicians
Members of Larne Borough Council
Ulster Unionist Party councillors
Living people
Politicians from County Antrim